Georges Lautner (24 January 1926 – 22 November 2013) was a French film director and screenwriter, known primarily for his comedies created in collaboration with screenwriter Michel Audiard.

Lautner's ventures into other genres were less successful though the thriller Le Professionnel starring Jean-Paul Belmondo was a big commercial hit in France in 1981.

He was born in Nice, the son of actress Renée Saint-Cyr.

Biography

Career

Filmography

As director 
 1958: La Môme aux boutons
 1960: Arrêtez les tambours
 1960: 
 1961: Le Monocle noir
 1962: Le Septième juré
 1962: En plein cirage
 1962: L'Œil du Monocle
 1963: Les Tontons flingueurs
 1964: Salad by the Roots
 1964: Le Monocle rit jaune
 1964: Les Barbouzes
 1965: Les Bons Vivants, co-directed with Gilles Grangier
 1966: 
 1966: 
 1967: 
 1968: 
 1968: 
 1971: Road to Salina
 1971: 
 1972: 
 1973: 
 1973: Quelques messieurs trop tranquilles
 1974: Les Seins de glace
 1975: Pas de problème !
 1976: On aura tout vu
 1977: Death of a Corrupt Man
 1978: Ils sont fous ces sorciers
 1979: Cop or Hood
 1980: Le Guignolo
 1981: Est-ce bien raisonnable ?
 1981: Le Professionnel
 1983: My Other Husband (Attention! Une femme peut en cacher une autre)
 1984: Le Cowboy
 1984: Happy Easter
 1985: La Cage aux Folles 3: The Wedding
 1987: La Vie dissolue de Gérard Floque
 1988: La Maison assassinée
 1989: L'Invité surprise
 1990: 
 1991: Triplex
 1992: 
 1992: Prêcheur en eau trouble (TV)
 1992: Stranger in the House
 1994: L'Homme de mes rêves (TV)
 1996: Le Comédien (TV)
 2000: Scénarios sur la drogue (segment Le bistrot)

As screenwriter 
 1960: Arrêtez les tambours
 1960: 
 1962: En plein cirage
 1962: L'Œil du Monocle
 1963: Les Tontons flingueurs
 1964: Salad by the Roots
 1964: Le Monocle rit jaune
 1965: Les Bons Vivants, co-directed with Gilles Grangier
 1966: 
 1967: 
 1968: 
 1968: 
 1970: Strogoff, directed by Eriprando Visconti
 1971: Road to Salina
 1971: 
 1972: 
 1973: 
 1973: Quelques messieurs trop tranquilles
 1975: Pas de problème !
 1978: Ils sont fous ces sorciers
 1981: Le Professionnel
 1984: Le Cowboy
 1984: Happy Easter
 1985: La Cage aux Folles 3: The Wedding
 1987: La Vie dissolue de Gérard Floque
 1988: La Maison assassinée
 1989: L'Invité surprise
 1990: Présumé dangereux
 1992: Prêcheur en eau trouble (TV)
 1992: Stranger in the House
 1994: L'Homme de mes rêves (TV)
 1995: Entre ces mains-là, directed by Arnaud Sélignac (TV)
 2003: La Trilogie des 'Monocle', directed by David Maltese (TV)

As actor 
 The Pirates of the Bois de Boulogne (1954)

Bibliography 
On achève bien les cons !, is a thriller comic written by Georges Lautner and drawn by Phil Castaza, published by Soleil Productions in January the 28th 2004. This comics has been recently adapted for the screen by SystemD Productions.

References

External links
 
 

1926 births
2013 deaths
French film directors
French people of German descent
People from Nice
Commandeurs of the Ordre des Arts et des Lettres